The Russian Orthodox Cross (or just the Orthodox Cross by some Russian Orthodox traditions) is a variation of the Christian cross since the 16th century in Russia, although it bears some similarity to a cross with a bottom crossbeam slanted the other way (upwards) found since the 6th century in the Byzantine Empire. The Russian Orthodox cross has three horizontal crossbeams, with the lowest one slanted downwards. Nowadays it is a symbol of the Russian Orthodox Church and a distinctive feature of the cultural landscape of Russia. Other names for the symbol include the Russian cross, and Slavonic or Suppedaneum cross.

The earliest cross with a slanted footstool (pointing upwards, unlike the Russian cross) was introduced in the 6th century before the break between Catholic and Orthodox churches, and was used in Byzantine frescoes, arts and crafts. In 1551 during the canonical isolation of the Russian Orthodox Church, Ivan the Terrible, Grand Prince of Moscow, first used this cross, with the footstool tilted the other way, on the domes of churches. From this time, it started to be depicted on the Russian state coat of arms and military banners. In the second half of the 19th century, this cross was promoted by the Russian Empire in the former Grand Duchy of Lithuania as a symbol of its Russification policy.

One variant known as the Russian cross has only two horizontal crossbeams with the lower one slanted; another is the cross over crescent variant. Some Russian sources distinguish the Russian Orthodox cross from the Orthodox cross. In Unicode the symbol (☦) is denoted as Orthodox cross. The same USVA headstone emblem is called Russian Orthodox cross.

Name 
According to many sources the name of the three beam slanted cross is Russian (Orthodox) cross.

Sometimes it is also called the Byzantine cross. Alternatively, "Byzantine cross" is also the name for a Latin cross with outwardly spreading ends, as it was the most common cruciform in the Byzantine Empire. Other crosses (patriarchal cross, Russian Orthodox cross, etc.) are sometimes as Byzantine crosses, as they also were used in Byzantine culture.

Sometimes it is also called just Orthodox cross. At the same time the various Orthodox churches use different crosses, and any of them may be called an "Orthodox cross". Moreover, there are no crosses universally acknowledged as "Orthodox" or "Catholic": each type is a feature of local tradition. The cross has also been referred to as the "Eastern Cross," and "has a special place in Ukrainian religious life" and has been used by Ukrainian Orthodox and Ukrainian (Greek) Catholic churches. For example, this particular cross is also claimed to be Kievan and "Ukrainian" by Ukrainian Catholics and Orthodox Christians.

Meaning 

The topmost of the three crossbeams represents Pilate's inscription which in the older Greek tradition is "The King of Glory", based on John's Gospel; but in later images it represents . The middle crossbeam is the main bar to which the victim's hands are fixed, while the bottom crossbeam represents the footrest which prolongs the torture. In many depictions, the side to Christ's right is higher, slanting upward toward the penitent thief St. Dismas, who according to the apocryphal tradition was crucified on Jesus' right, but downward toward impenitent thief Gestas. It is also a common perception that the foot-rest points up, toward Heaven, on Christ's right hand-side, and downward, to Hell, on Christ's left. The cross is often depicted in icons "of the crucifixion in historic Byzantine style."

One variation of the Russian Cross is the 'Cross over Crescent', which is sometimes accompanied by "Gabriel perched on the top of the Cross blowing his trumpet." Didier Chaudet, in the academic journal China and Eurasia Forum Quarterly, writes that an "emblem of the Orthodox Church is a cross on top on a crescent. It is said that this  symbol was devised by Ivan the Terrible, after the conquest of the city of Kazan, as a symbol of the victory of Christianity over Islam through his  soldiers".

Another variation is the monastic Calvary Cross, in which the cross is situated atop the hill of Calvary, its slopes symbolized by steps. To the viewer's left is the Holy Lance, with which Jesus was wounded in his side, and to the right, the pole topped by a hyssop sponge with which he was given vinegar. Under Calvary are Adam's skull and bones; the right-arm bone is usually above the left one, and believers fold their arms across their chests in this way during Orthodox communion. Around the cross are abbreviations in Church Slavonic. This type of cross is usually embroidered on a schema-monk's robe.

Current usage 

The Russian (Orthodox) cross (☦) is widely used by the Russian Orthodox Church, and has been widely adopted in the Polish Orthodox and the Czech and Slovak Orthodox Churches, which received their autonomous status from the Patriarch of Moscow in 1948 and 1951 respectively. It is also sometimes used by the Ecumenical Patriarchate of Constantinople (e.g. in the American Carpatho-Russian Orthodox Diocese). "Though commonly associated with the Russian Orthodox Church, this [cross] is found also in the Greek and Serbian Orthodox churches" and is also used by Eastern Rite Catholic Churches.

This cross is also found in Byzantine frescoes in churches now belonging to the Greek and Serbian Orthodox churches.
Also the Cross is used by the AIPCA churches in Kenya.

History 

The slanted cross with three horizontal crossbeams existed already in the 6th century, long before the Great Schism. However, it was used only in church paintings, arts and crafts, and never on church domes. There are old frescoes depicting this type of cross in the regions of modern Greece and Serbia. One Byzantine icon featuring the three-bar cross, with the slanted crossbeam for the feet of Christ, is an 11th century mosaic of the resurrection. The three-bar cross "existed very early in Byzantium, but was adopted by the Russian Orthodox Church and especially popularized in Slavic countries."

At the end of the 15th century this cross started to be widely used in Muscovy when its rulers declared themselves the "Third Rome", successors of Byzantium and defenders of Orthodoxy. In 1551 at the council of the canonically isolated Russian Orthodox Church, the Grand Prince of Moscow Ivan the Terrible decided to standardize the cross on Russian church domes to distinguish Muscovy from the "Lithuanian, Polack cross". This was the first time the Russian Orthodox Cross was used on church domes. Between 1577–1625, the Russian Orthodox cross was depicted between the heads of a double-headed eagle in the coat of arms of Russia. It was drawn on military banners until the end of the 17th century.

In 1654, the Moscow council, erasing the vestiges of the canonical isolation of 1448-1589, coordinated Russian Orthodox liturgy with that of other Orthodox churches. At this council, Patriarch Nikon ordered the use of the Greek cross instead of Russian Orthodox cross. These reforms provoked the Raskol schism. Replacement of the Russian Orthodox cross by Greek cross was caused by Russian disrespect for the second one. Soon, however, the Russian Orthodox Church began to use the Russian Orthodox cross again. According to the Metropolitan of Ryazan and Murom Stefan, the Russian Orthodox cross was worn by Czar Peter I (1672-1725), who transformed the Moscow Patriarchate into the Most Holy Synod.

In the 19th and 20th centuries, the Russian Orthodox cross was promoted by the Russian Empire and USSR in Belarus, Poland and Ukraine as a part of Russification policies. At the end of the 20th century and the beginning of the 21st century, the Russian Orthodox Church replaced many traditional Greek Orthodox crosses in Belarus with Russian Orthodox crosses. This suggests that it was understood as an nationalist Russian symbol rather than a religious Orthodox one.

The Russian Orthodox cross is depicted on emblems of several Russian ultra-nationalist organizations such as Brotherhood of Russian Truth and Russian National Unity.

Gallery

See also 

 Cross of Lorraine

References

External links 

 
 
 

Byzantine Rite
Crosses by form
Crosses by culture
National symbols of Russia